SK-Babies is a German television series.

See also
List of German television series

External links
 

German crime television series
1990s German police procedural television series
1996 German television series debuts
1999 German television series endings
German-language television shows
RTL (German TV channel) original programming